Alex Márta (born 6 June 1984), better known by his stage name ByeAlex, is a Hungarian indie pop singer, songwriter, journalist, and novelist. He represented Hungary in the Eurovision Song Contest 2013 in Malmö, Sweden, with the song "Kedvesem", coming 10th in the final. In 2014 his debut novel Özséb, egy öngyilkos Miskolcon (Özséb, a suicide in Miskolc) was published in Hungary.

In the Summer of 2015, ByeAlex decided to add 'és a Slepp' ('and the Slepp') to the name of band referring to the following musicians playing with Alex: Szeifert Bálint – bass guitar, vocals, Schnellbach Dávid – guitar, Tóth G. Zoltán – (acoustic) guitar, (and manager), Fekete Balázs – drums.

In 2017, the formation Senkise was formed consisting of Alex Márta and Gergő Schmidt (aka TEMBO).

Early life and career
ByeAlex was born in Kisvárda. He started singing at an early age. He went to school in Fényeslitke, and went on to study at the Bessenyei György Highschool in Kisvárda. He got a Master's degree in Philosophy from the University of Miskolc. He became famous when he won A Dal, the national selection competition in Hungary for the Eurovision Song Contest in 2013. He then represented Hungary with the song Kedvesem. He returned to A Dal for the 2018 edition, writing the music and lyrics for H Y P N O T I Z E D, performed by Roland Gulyás.

Discography

Albums 
Szörpoholista (2013)

 Kedvesem
 Nekemte
 Láttamoztam
 Csóró itt minden hang
 Bocs, hogy (feat. Ív)
 Messziről
 Csókolom
 Elvis(z)
 Az én rózsám
 Te vagy
 Játék
 Kedvesem (Zoohacker remix)
 Kedvesem (Lotfi Begi's Deep in the Forest Mix)
 Láttamoztam (Kristian remix)
 A fekete zongora (Poem by Endre Ady)

Szív(sz)Kill (2017) (ByeAlex és a Slepp)

 Az vagyok
 Cukor
 Nehéz vagyok
 Kicsilány
 Muslicak
 Szivem udvarában
 Szerelem
 Még mindig ...
 Babao (feat. Lotfi Begi)
 Fekete (feat. Dannona)
 Részeg (feat. Pixa)
 Tél
 Menned kéne (feat. Lábas Viki)
 Még mindig ... (Lotfi Begi Remix)

Singles
2012

 Csókolom
 Láttamoztam
 Te vagy (John the Valiant feat. ByeAlex)
 Kedvesem / Kedvesem (Zoohacker Remix)

2013

 One For Me (English version of the song "Kedvesem")
 Nekemte
 Messziről
 Hé Budapest
 Játék (Soerii & Poolek feat. ByeAlex)

2015

 Fekete
 Apám sírjánál
 Még mindig...

2016

 Nehéz vagyok
 Részeg

2017

 Bababo
 Az vagyok
 U,u,u (Senkise x Majka)

2018

 Nemveszemfel (Senkise)
 Jáhá (Senkise)
 Korskorskors (Senkise x Hiro)
 Menned kéne (with Lábas Viki)
 Széllel szemben (ByeAlex és a Slepp – Soundtrack for the RTL TV Show "Tanár")
 Roksztármód (Senkise)
 MIND (Senkise)
 Pupilláid (ByeAlex és a Slepp)

2019
 Anya (ByeAlex és a Slepp x Giajjenno)

See also
Hungarian indie
Hungarian pop

References

21st-century Hungarian male singers
Eurovision Song Contest entrants of 2013
Eurovision Song Contest entrants for Hungary
Living people
1984 births
People from Szabolcs-Szatmár-Bereg County